Elf is the first studio album by Ronnie James Dio's blues rock band called Elf. Produced by Ian Paice and Roger Glover of Deep Purple, the record was released in 1972.

On this album, Dio is credited by his birth name, Ronald Padavona. Though Dio had used "Padavona" for songwriting credits on earlier singles, Dio explained in an interview in 1994 that he used his birth name on this album as a tribute to his parents so that they could see their family name on an album at least once.

After this album, Steve Edwards replaced David Feinstein on guitar, and Craig Gruber took over bass duties, leaving Dio solely as the lead singer. This future lineup, minus Edwards, became the first incarnation of Ritchie Blackmore's Rainbow when guitarist Ritchie Blackmore formed it after leaving Deep Purple.

Track listing

Personnel
 Ronald Padavona (later Ronnie James Dio) – vocals, bass guitar
 David Feinstein – guitars
 Micky Lee Soule – piano, organ
 Gary Driscoll – drums

References

Elf (band) albums
1972 debut albums
Albums produced by Roger Glover